Ost is a Germanic surname. Notable people with the surname include:

Alfred Ost (1884–1945), Belgian artist
Daniel Ost (born 1955), Belgian artist known for his work with plants
Louis Ost (1893–1960), American college football coach
Valerie Van Ost (born 1944), English actress